Izbište is a village in Serbia. It is situated in the Vršac municipality, in the South Banat District, Vojvodina province. The village has a Serb ethnic majority (86.74%) and its population is 1,464 according to the 2011 census.

Name 

In Serbian, the village is known as Izbište (Избиште), in Romanian as Pârneaora, in Hungarian as Izbistye, and in German as Izbischte.

The first written evidence 

The oldest preserved written document in which the mentioned populated place Izbište dates from 1660, and it follows that from 1666 year. In both cases it is a hand written scrapbook of Serbian Orthodox Church priest, who keeps track of the contributions of households. Scrapbook or "Katastig", as was then called, contains a list of financial and commodity contributions, which are, by any obligation or voluntarily, are given to Serbian Patriarchate of Peć. This document is now stored in the Library of Serbian Patriarchate.

Famous residents 

Žarko Zrenjanin-Uča – people's hero of Yugoslavia, partisan and leader of communist movement in Vojvodina, was born in 1902 in Izbište.
Isa Jovanović – people's hero, Yugoslav partisan, after the war a member of the Council of the Federation of the Federal People's Republic of Yugoslavia  
Anđa Jovanović-Ranković – people's hero, Yugoslav partisan, killed during World War II in Yugoslavia.

Population 

The post-war development of Izbište was stop by destruction of brick-field and power plant. Izbište had up to 3500 inhabitants, many of whom were educated and as such, went for Vršac, Bela Crkva, Pančevo, Belgrade and then continued their careers there.

Gallery

External links 
Izbiste official site

Vršac
Populated places in Serbian Banat
Populated places in South Banat District